The Insel Range is a series of ice-free flat-topped peaks resembling islands which rise above the surrounding terrain and separate McKelvey Valley from Balham Valley, in Victoria Land, Antarctica. It was so named by the Victoria University of Wellington Antarctic Expedition (1958–59) because of the resemblance to islands.

Features
Geographical features include:

 Balham Valley
 Bullseye Lake
 Canfield Mesa
 Green Mesa
 Halzen Mesa
 McKelvey Valley
 Mount Insel

References

Mountain ranges of Victoria Land
McMurdo Dry Valleys